Sandy Point National Wildlife Refuge preserves habitat for threatened and endangered species, with particular emphasis on the leatherback sea turtle (Dermochelys coriacea).  Its two miles (3 km) of sandy beaches on the southwest corner of Saint Croix, U.S. Virgin Islands is an ideal nesting place for leatherbacks.  The National Wildlife Refuge is open to the public for limited hours on Saturdays and Sundays.

The Aklis Archeological Site, a prehistoric shell midden on the coast, is in the refuge.  The  site dates back to the year 400 and show evidence of human occupation for over 200 years, and has yielded a wide variety of artifacts, including pottery and stone tool fragments, and human remains.  The site is subject to gradual erosion. It was listed on the National Register of Historic Places in 1976.

The last scene of the 1994 film The Shawshank Redemption was filmed in the refuge.

Sandy Point NWR is administered as part of the Caribbean Islands National Wildlife complex.

Gallery

See also
List of National Wildlife Refuges
National Register of Historic Places listings in the United States Virgin Islands

References

External links
Sandy Point National Wildlife Refuge homepage

National Wildlife Refuges of the United States in the Caribbean
National Register of Historic Places in the United States Virgin Islands
Protected areas of the United States Virgin Islands
Protected areas established in 1984
1984 establishments in the United States Virgin Islands
Saint Croix, U.S. Virgin Islands
Beaches of the United States Virgin Islands